Aulendorf station is a junction station on the Ulm–Friedrichshafen railway in the German state of Baden-Württemberg running between Ulm and Friedrichshafen. It was opened in 1847.

Location 
The station is located on the eastern edge of the centre of Aulendorf in the district of Ravensburg. On the western side of the station is the central bus station.

The railway station 
The station consists of an entrance building and several outbuildings. It has five platform tracks, tracks 1–4 and track 1a (formerly platform 13) to the south of the station.

History
The Royal Württemberg State Railways opened the Friedrichshafen–Ravensburg section of the Ulm–Friedrichshafen railway (Württemberg Southern Railway) in 1847 and extended it through Aulendorf to Biberach on 26 May 1849. The line was electrified in 2021.

In 1869, the Herbertingen–Isny railway was opened and Aulendorf station became the main railway junction in Upper Swabia.

The construction of the railways during a time of great distress in rural Aulendorf kept many people from starvation or emigration. The railway and the post office were the largest employer in Aulendorf at that time.

Rail services 
The station is classified by Deutsche Bahn as a category 4 station.

Long-distance 
Aulendorf station is served a pair of Intercity services running between Dortmund (from Bochum southbound) and Innsbruck and a pair of Railjet services between Frankfurt and Vienna Airport.

Regional services 
As of December 2021, Aulendorf is the hub of hourly Regional-Express services from Ulm to Friedrichshafen and hourly services towards Sigmaringen. Services run hourly on the Herbertingen–Isny railway alternatively to Hergatz or Kißlegg. Aulendorf is also the starting point of hourly Bodensee-Oberschwaben-Bahn (BOB) services towards Friedrichshafen.

Freight 
Aulendorf station is served regularly by freight trains.

Services in the station 
The station building has a ticket office, a bakery and a kiosk, but no toilet.

Notes

External links 

Railway stations in Baden-Württemberg
Railway stations in Germany opened in 1849
Buildings and structures in Ravensburg (district)
19th-century establishments in Württemberg